Long March 8 is an orbital launch vehicle developed by the China Academy of Launch Vehicle Technology to launch up to 5000 kg to a 700 km altitude Sun-synchronous orbit (SSO). The rocket is based on the Long March 7 with its first stage and two boosters, along with the existing liquid hydrogen burning third stage of the Long March 3A/3B/3C and 7A as its second stage. The boosters are omitted in the "core only" variant that first flew on its second launch in February 2022.

A planned future launch vehicle variant of the Long March 8 will be partially reusable by featuring a combined booster recovery of the first stage and the boosters as a single unit.

The maiden flight of the Long March 8 was launched on 22 December 2020 from the Wenchang Spacecraft Launch Site.

Launch Statistics

List of launches

See also 

 Long March 9
 Comparison of orbital launchers families
 Comparison of orbital launch systems
 Expendable launch system
 Lists of rockets

References 

Vehicles introduced in 2020
2020 in China
2020 in technology
Long March (rocket family)